Gino Cassinis (27 January 1885 – 13 January 1964) was an Italian Democratic Socialist Party politician. He was born in Milan. He was mayor of Milan. He was knight grand cross and grand officer of the Order of Merit of the Italian Republic. He died in Rome.

References

1885 births
1964 deaths
20th-century Italian politicians
Mayors of Milan
Knights Grand Cross of the Order of Merit of the Italian Republic
Grand Officers of the Order of Merit of the Italian Republic
Italian Democratic Socialist Party politicians